Bergischer Handball-Club 06 is a handball club from the cities of Wuppertal and Solingen, Germany, that plays in the Handball-Bundesliga.

History
The club originates from a 2006 contract between Stefan Adam, then chairman of LTV Wuppertal, and SG Solingen, incorporating the Wuppertal club's management, squad and main sponsor into the Solingen-based club and renaming it to officially represent the entire Bergisches Land region. In 2011, "Die Löwen" were promoted to the Handball-Bundesliga for the first time since their establishment in 2006, though they were relegated in the first season. Bergischer HC reached the DHB-Pokal FINAL4 in the 2015–16 season, but were defeated by SC Magdeburg.

Accomplishments
2. Handball-Bundesliga: 3
: 2011, 2013, 2018

Crest, colours, supporters

Kit manufacturers

Kits

Team

Current squad
Squad for the 2022–23 season

Technical staff
 Head coach:  Jamal Naji
 Assistant coach:  Markus Pütz
 Assistant coach:  Peer Pütz
 Goalkeeping coach:  Björgvin Páll Gústavsson
 Athletic Trainer:  Oliver Schuhmacher
 Physiotherapist:  Severin Feldmann
 Club Doctor:  Dr. Diederich von der Heyde

Transfers
Transfers for the 2023–24 season

Joining 
  Eloy Morante Maldonado (CB) (from  TUSEM Essen)
  Elias Scholtes (RB) (from  Rhein-Neckar Löwen)
  Aron Seesing (LP) (from  TSV Bayer Dormagen)
  Yannick Fraatz (RW) (back from loan at  THW Kiel)
  Mads Kjeldgaard Andersen (LB) (from  Bjerringbro-Silkeborg Håndbold)

Leaving 
  Tom Bergner (LP) (on loan to  Eulen Ludwigshafen)

Previous squads

EHF ranking

Former club members

Notable former players

  Fabian Böhm (2011–2012)
  Fabian Gutbrod (2013–)
  Chrischa Hannawald (2008–2009)
  Michael Hegemann (2012–2014)
  Hendrik Pekeler (2010–2012)
  Moritz Preuss (2014–2017)
  Christopher Rudeck (2015–)
  David Schmidt (2020–)
  Lukas Stutzke (2019–)
  Patrick Wiencek (2007–2008)
  Alexander Hermann (2015–2017)
  Maximilian Hermann (2013–2017)
  Viktor Szilágyi (2012–2017)
  Richard Wöss (2011–2014)
  Duje Miljak (2013–2014)
  Stanko Sabljić (2012–2014)
  Tomáš Babák (2016–)
  Milan Kotrč (2017–2019)
  Tomáš Mrkva (2019–2022)
  Leoš Petrovský (2017–2020)
  Jan Štochl (2009–2013)
  Jiří Vítek (2007–2013)
  Henrik Knudsen (2011–2012)
  Ivan Zoubkoff (2006–2009)
 Uroš Vilovski (2016–2017)
  Pouya Norouzi Nezhad (2017)
  Arnór Þór Gunnarsson (2012–)
  Björgvin Páll Gústavsson (2013–2017)
  Ragnar Jóhannsson (2019–2020)
  Rúnar Kárason (2011–2012)
  Aco Jonovski (2015–2017)
  Jeffrey Boomhouwer (2018–2022)
  Joey Duin (2008–2010)
  Kenneth Klev (2008–2012)
  Tom Kåre Nikolaisen (2020–)
  Maciej Majdziński (2016–)
  Bogdan Criciotoiu (2016–2019)
  Inal Aflitulin (2015–2016)
  Igor Chumak (2007)
  Rafael Baena González (2018–2020)
  Carlos Prieto (2012)
  Miloš Dragaš (2014–2015)
  Csaba Szücs (2017–)
  Linus Arnesson (2017–)
  Emil Berggren (2012–2014)
  Max Darj (2017–2022)
  Emil Hansson (2021–2022)
  Peter Johannesson (2022–)
  Isak Persson (2022–)

Former coaches

References

External links
 Official website

German handball clubs
Sport in Wuppertal
Solingen
Handball clubs established in 2006
2006 establishments in Germany
Handball-Bundesliga